Irene Frances Rich ( Luther; October 13, 1891 – April 22, 1988) was an American actress who worked in both silent films and talkies, as well as radio.

Early life

Rich was born in Buffalo, New York.

At age 17, she wed Elvo Elcourt Deffenbaugh at All Saints' Cathedral in Spokane, Washington on February 17, 1909, after her parents talked about sending her to boarding school. The couple had one child, born Irene Frances Luther Deffenbaugh, who later adopted her stepfather's surname and was a stage and film actress in the 1930s known as Frances Rich before becoming a noted sculptor. Elvo Deffenbaugh was a salesman who traveled a lot. The young family moved to the Bay Area of San Francisco, where the marriage ended after two years.

Next, Irene married Charles Henry Rich, who was then a lieutenant in the United States Army (became a major during World War I and was later a lieutenant colonel), in Portland, Oregon on January 9, 1912. The two had met when he was stationed with the 25th Infantry at Fort George Wright in Spokane. They had one daughter, Martha Jane Rich, who was born on December 13, 1916. The marriage ended after four years. Luther went into real estate to provide for herself and her daughters. She then went to Hollywood in 1918 and found work as an extra.

Career

Rich worked for Will Rogers, who used her in eight pictures, including Water Water Everywhere (1920), The Strange Boarder (1920), Jes' Call Me Jim (1920), Boys Will Be Boys (1921) and The Ropin' Fool (1921). She often portrayed society women, such as in the 1925 adaptation of Lady Windermere's Fan and also in Queen of the Yukon (1940). In two of her last films she played a frontier wife and mother. She was the mother of Gail Russell's character 'Penelope Worth', in John Wayne's Angel and the Badman as well as in John Ford's cavalry story Fort Apache in which she portrayed Mrs. O'Rourke, the wife of Sergeant O'Rourke (Ward Bond). 

In the 1930s, Rich did much work in radio. From 1933 to 1944, she hosted a nationwide anthology program of serialized mini-dramas, Dear John (aka The Irene Rich Show). Her leading man was actor Gale Gordon, (who later played Lucille Ball's apoplectic boss "Mr. Mooney" on TV). In the early 1940s, Rich starred in Glorious One on NBC Blue. Rich appeared in stage productions, including Seven Keys to Baldpate (1935) which starred George M. Cohan, the creator of the play, and later As the Girls Go in 1948.

Personal life
Rich married for the third time on April 6, 1927, in Del Monte, California, to real estate mogul David Ferguson Blankenhorn (1886–1969), at the home of William May Garland.  Blankenhorn was well known in the Los Angeles real estate market, was a longtime resident of Pasadena and San Francisco, and handled the transaction of William Wrigley, Jr. purchasing Catalina Island in 1919.  Rich and Blankenhorn separated at least three times in the summer and fall of 1931, they filed for divorce on October 30, 1931, they were divorced that November.

She became involved in a deadly love triangle in 1949 when Agnes Elizabeth Garnier shot and killed wealthy businessman John Edwin Owen (1881–1949).  Owen, formerly a businessman and politician from Michigan, was president of the National Apartment House Owner's Association, among other business interests, including cattle and horse ranching in Gunnison, Colorado and Riverside, California. The Riverside County Sheriff's Department investigator said that Garnier killed Owen (who was married, but estranged and separated from his wife) and blamed Rich for coming between them. Garnier, Owen's personal secretary, told the district attorney that the gun went off accidentally and she took the gun from an intoxicated Owen as he was going to bed. Rich said that she was not in love with Owen and that they were just friends. Garnier pleaded not guilty. The prosecutor decided not to try for first degree murder, and she was found guilty of manslaughter, and received a sentence of "one-to-ten" years.  Garnier, after losing her appeal in January 1950, was released from Tehachapi Prison in May 1951 after serving less than a year-and-a-half. She died in San Diego in 1990 at the age of 93.

Family and death
Rich was married four times, the first time at age 17. She had two daughters, Frances and Jane. On February 28, 1950, Rich married her last husband, George Henry Clifford (1881–1959), a public utilities executive, at The Sherry-Netherland Hotel in New York City. He was president of Stone & Webster Service Corporation. The couple bought an avocado ranch within Hope Ranch, near Santa Barbara, in 1956, where they lived out the remainder of their lives.

On April 22, 1988, Irene Rich died at age 96 of heart failure in Hope Ranch, California.

Rich has two stars on the Hollywood Walk of Fame, one for her contribution to the motion picture industry at 6225 Hollywood Boulevard and one for her contributions to the radio industry at 6150 Hollywood Boulevard.

Filmography

References

External links

 
 
 
 Irene Rich at Virtual History
 Actress Loses Weight By Using Sponsor
Irene Rich(aveleyman)

1891 births
1988 deaths
American film actresses
American silent film actresses
American radio actresses
American stage actresses
Actresses from Buffalo, New York
20th-century American actresses
Warner Bros. contract players